The Women's Junior South American Volleyball Championship is a sport competition for national women's volleyball teams with players under 21 years, currently held biannually and organized by the Confederación Sudamericana de Voleibol (CSV), the South American volleyball federation.

Results summary

Medals summary

MVP by edition
1972 - 1992 - Unknown
1994 - 
1996 - Unknown
1998 - Unknown
2000 - Unknown
2002 - Unknown
2004 - 
2006 - 
2008 - 
2010 - 
2012 - 
2014 - 
2016 - 
2018 -

See also

 Men's Junior South American Volleyball Championship
 Women's U22 South American Volleyball Championship
 Girls' Youth South American Volleyball Championship
 Girls' U16 South American Volleyball Championship

References

External links
 CSV

U20
U20
Recurring sporting events established in 1972
International volleyball competitions
International women's volleyball competitions
Youth volleyball
Biennial sporting events